Mehdiyan is a famous graveyard on left side of Delhi Gate, where Shah Waliullah was buried beside his father Shah Abdur Rahim.
Indian freedom fighter and Islamic scholar Hifzur Rahman Seoharwi is buried in this cemetery.

Notable interments
 Shah Abdur Rahim
 Shah Waliullah Dehlawi
 Mamluk Ali Nanautawi
 Hifzur Rahman Seoharwi
 Atiqur Rahman Usmani
 Momin Khan Momin

References

Cemeteries in India
Buildings and structures in Delhi